The Eastern Suburbs is the eastern metropolitan region of Sydney, New South Wales, Australia.

Location
The Eastern Suburbs of Sydney in the greater sense refers to the residential, commercial and industrial areas that are situated to the east and south-east of the Sydney central business district, around the southern shore of Sydney Harbour to the Pacific Ocean beaches and continuing on to the port at Botany Bay and La Perouse. The region includes all of the suburbs within local government areas of the Municipality of Woollahra, Waverley Council and City of Randwick as well as eastern parts of Bayside Council and City of Sydney.
 
In the traditional sense the Eastern Suburbs only refers to the suburbs directly east of the CBD within the Woollahra Council and Waverley Council districts as well as The Centennial Parklands and occasionally also includes the east side of City of Sydney. City of Randwick and the eastern portion of Bayside Council. The Australian Bureau of Statistics (ABS) limits its definition of the “Eastern Suburbs Statistical Subdivision" to comprising just the Woollahra, Waverley and Randwick local government areas.

For descriptive purposes, the Eastern Suburbs can be grouped into three parts:

Upper Eastern Suburbs 

The Eastern Suburbs from a more narrow, conservative perspective are all the suburbs within the Waverley Council and Woollahra Council districts as well as the Centennial Parklands. This begins with all suburbs east and north of the parklands starting with Paddington, Waverley and Bronte then continuing north as far as Watsons Bay. Postcodes of the Upper Eastern Suburbs start at 2021 with Paddington and The Centennial Parklands then continue to 2030 with Vaucluse, Dover Heights and Watsons Bay. The Upper Eastern Suburbs roughly correspond with the cadastral Parish of Alexandria as well as the Federal Division of Wentworth.

South-Eastern Suburbs 

The South-Eastern Suburbs are the suburbs directly south-east of the CBD falling in the City of Randwick council and eastern side of Bayside Council. This is all the suburbs south of The Centennial Parklands and east of the Eastern Distributor starting with Kensington, Randwick and Clovelly then following south down to La Perouse. The postcodes begin with 2031 in Randwick and Clovelly then end in 2036 with La Perouse and surrounding suburbs with the addition of Botany and Banksmeadow being 2019 and the eastern non-residential side of Eastlakes having the postcode 2018. The University of New South Wales postcode is 2052. The South-Eastern Suburbs roughly correspond with the cadastral Parish of Botany as well as the Federal Division of Kingsford Smith.

Inner East

The inner east are suburbs which surround the eastern and south-eastern border of Sydney CBD and fall within the City of Sydney. They are often referred to as both inner city and eastern suburbs. These suburbs include Surry Hills, Darlinghurst, Potts Point, Elizabeth Bay, Woolloomooloo and Rushcutters Bay with the postcodes of 2010 and 2011. 

The inner southern suburbs of the City of Sydney and Bayside Council which are south of Central station, west of The Eastern Distributor and north of the Airport Starting with Redfern and ending in Mascot are sometimes included in this region as well as part of South-Eastern Sydney or the Eastern Suburbs overall however strictly speaking these suburbs are not east nor south-east of Sydney CBD.

Landmarks
The largest commercial areas in the Eastern Suburbs are found at Bondi Junction, Randwick, Maroubra and Double Bay. The Eastern Suburbs features some of Sydney's well-known beaches such as Bondi Beach, Bronte Beach, and Coogee Beach. The University of New South Wales is located in Kensington. The major hospitals serving the region are St Vincent's Hospital in Darlinghurst and Prince of Wales Hospital in Randwick. The Eastern Suburbs Banksia Scrub lie on the coastal areas of the region, albeit in fragments.

Transport
The Eastern Suburbs railway line opened in 1979 with stations at Kings Cross, Edgecliff and Bondi Junction. The CBD and South East Light Rail opened to Randwick in 2019 and Kingsford in 2020.

Transdev Sydney Ferries operate services to Darling Point, Double Bay, Rose Bay and Watsons Bay. Bus services are operated by Transdev John Holland and Transit Systems NSW.

Major roads include Anzac Parade, Bondi Road, the Eastern Distributor, New South Head Road, Old South Head Road, Oxford Street and Syd Einfeld Drive.

Gallery

Sporting teams

In the National Rugby League, the Eastern Suburbs is represented by the Sydney Roosters playing out of the Sydney Football Stadium. For the South-Eastern Suburbs in City of Randwick and Bayside Council, the South Sydney Rabbitohs are supported. South Sydney Rabbitohs has a juniors club at Kingsford, Maroubra and Malabar. 

In the Australian Football League, the Sydney Swans are a professional Australian rules football club. The Swans' headquarters and training facilities are located at the Sydney Cricket Ground, the club's playing home ground since 1982.

The NSW Blues are a professional first class men's cricket team also based at the Sydney Cricket Ground. The team competes in the Sheffield Shield Australia's first class interstate cricket competition.

The Sydney Sixers are a NSW professional franchise men's cricket team, competing in Australia's domestic Twenty20 cricket competition, the Big Bash League.

The Eastern Suburbs Football Association (ESFA) is the delegated authority governing soccer in the Eastern Suburbs of Sydney. ESFA offers women's competitions including AAW Premier League running from April through to August.

Suburbs in Eastern Sydney

Upper Eastern Suburbs

Woollahra Council

Waverley Council

Centennial Parklands

 Centennial Park
 Moore Park
 Queens Park

South-Eastern Suburbs

City of Randwick

Bayside Council (Eastern Side)

Inner East

City of Sydney (Eastern Side)

References

External links 

SYDNEY.com – Sydney East
 Australian Bureau of Statistics - 2016 Census - Sydney - Eastern Suburbs

Regions of Sydney